The Mixed 50m Free Rifle Prone SH1 shooting event at the 2004 Summer Paralympics was competed  on 23 September. It was won by Jonas Jacobsson, representing .

Preliminary

23 Sept. 2004, 09:00

Final round

23 Sept. 2004, 12:00

References

X